Moonstone: A Hard Days Knight is an action role-playing video game by Canadian independent developer Rob Anderson and published by Mindscape for the Amiga in 1991 and one year later converted to DOS with different sound and music. The title is a play on A Hard Day's Night.

Moonstone's gameplay blends several different genres, allowing up to four players to participate in a basic turn based game with real time combat for any encounters. It is also notable as one of the goriest games of its time, with some particularly bloody fight and death scenes.

Magazine advertisements for Moonstone purported 'nearly' a thousand frames of animation for two megabytes of monsters, and over 60 different painted backdrops.

Gameplay
The player takes on the role of a chosen knight who is sent by druids to return the mystical 'moonstone' to Stonehenge. The game supports between one and four players at once, with the computer controlling any knights not controlled by human players as rival NPCs. Gameplay consists of two distinct modes: turn-based exploration and real-time combat.

In turn-based mode each player can move a limited distance on the game's world map and visit various locations. Players will mostly visit the many dolmens that are scattered across the map. These places represent areas guarded by monsters. Visiting these dolmens will trigger the second main gameplay mode: real-time combat. Players take control of their chosen knights and attempts to defeat the monsters using sword combat similar to Barbarian: The Ultimate Warrior or Sword of Sodan.

Defeating the monsters rewards the player with treasures from that location. Success will also result in gaining one experience point (XP). These then can be distributed in one of the three abilities: Strength, Constitution and Endurance. The required amount of XP needed to advance varies according to the number of human-controlled characters. This, combined with some powerful weapons that can be discovered or bought, can boost the player's combat abilities. However, the difficulty of the game increases to compensate.

The game's objective is to find the lair that holds one of the four keys. The player who gathers together all four keys (either by finding them or by stealing them from rivals) will have access to the Valley of the Gods at the center of the map. The knight will have to fight against the Guardian in order to win a 'moonstone'. The moonstone corresponds randomly to a lunar phase, and grants the knight more power during that phase. The moonstone must be returned to Stonehenge for the game to be completed.

After some days, a dragon will appear and make regular sweeps across the land. In the event that an unskilled player is unfortunate enough to encounter the dragon early on in the game, defeat is almost inevitable.

Reception

When the game was released, it got quite positive reviews from some magazines while some reviewers did not like it at all. Moonstone was banned in Germany due to gameplay being conceived as extremely violent at the time and failed to find a distributor for the US market as well. These days the game has a large cult following among vintage gamers. The game is highly sought after as a collectible. The game was put on the German index by the BPjS.

The One gave the Amiga version of Moonstone an overall score of 82%, praising its graphics and sound effects, calling the introduction "wonderfully animated" and the game's sprites "beautifully animated", furthermore stating that Moonstone is "pleasing to the eye and the ear". The One criticises the hack-and-slash gameplay as somewhat repetitive, but praises the special combat moves, expressing "they open up a good deal more options than the slash 'em up fan is usually presented with".

References

External links

Moonstone: A Hard Days Knight at Hall of Light
The Moonstone Tavern - a fan site

1991 video games
Action role-playing video games
Amiga games
DOS games
Europe-exclusive video games
Fantasy video games set in the Middle Ages
Video games developed in Canada
Video games scored by Richard Joseph
Mindscape games
Multiplayer and single-player video games